Zeng Gun (曾袞; Wade–Giles: Tseng Kun) was an officer of Chinese Tang dynasty, he served as the governor of the Jinghai polity in northern Vietnam from 878 to 880. Zeng Gun also had served Gao Pian during the Nanzhao war. During the years he lived in northern Vietnam, he had interests in local culture and spent years in collecting local folklore. His works include the story Mountain spirit and the Spirit of Cao Lỗ. Contributions of Zeng Gun and Zhao Chang (fl. 791–802) later were cited by 14th century Vietnamese author Lý Tế Xuyên in Việt Điện U Linh Tập (1329).

References

Bibliography

Tang dynasty generals
Tang dynasty jiedushi of Jinghai Circuit
9th-century Chinese poets